The Maryina Roshcha Synagogue is a synagogue in Moscow established in 1925 at Vtoroy Vysheslavtsev Lane, 5a.

History

This synagogue is also called "the Second Moscow synagogue" (after the Moscow Choral Synagogue. The building, completed in 1996, replaced the one destroyed by fire in 1993. Since 2000 it's also a Chabad-Lubavitch Community Center.

The Synagogue is part of a large Jewish spiritual center under the auspices of the Moscow Jewish Public Center, which also incorporated nearby former Bakhmetevsky Bus Garage and Beyt Schwidler school.

External links
 Maryina Roshcha Synagogue (Moscow)

Chabad in Europe
Hasidic Judaism in Russia
Hasidic synagogues
Orthodox synagogues in Russia
Synagogues in Moscow
1925 establishments in Russia
Religious buildings and structures completed in 1996